Caleb Young is an American conductor.

Early life and education
Young was born in Asheville, North Carolina. From an early age he was interested in music and at the age of three, he was introduced to piano by his parents. During his time at high school, he played wind instruments. He studied euphonium at the University of Alabama and then later attended and graduated from the Jacobs School of Music at Indiana University with a master's degree in orchestral conducting in 2013. During his time at Indiana, he studied with conducting pedagogues, David Effron and Arthur Fagen.

Career
His career started in 2013 in Bloomington, when he created an orchestra named KammerMahler. The orchestra specializes in performing symphonic works in a chamber orchestra setting.

After graduating from Indiana University, Young served as assistant conductor with the Fort Wayne Philharmonic beginning in 2016.

In September 2018, he became the associate conductor at the Fort Wayne Philharmonic. As an associate conductor, he has conducted more than two hundred performances. His other notable works at Philharmonic include, starting Music+Mixology series and Musically Speaking pre-concert talks. In the same year, he was selected as "The Great Eight of 2018" for his contributions to Fort Wayne's arts community. Later, he received an Emerging Artist Award, awarded by Arts United of Greater Fort Wayne.

In 2021, Young was invited by Finnish conductor Jukka-Pekka Saraste to join the inaugural roster of Lead! Artists. He had his debut in Finland with the Finnish Chamber Orchestra in 2021 sharing a concert with Jukka-Pekka Saraste and Esa-Pekka Salonen. He has also worked with John Williams at the Berlin Philharmonic and the Los Angeles Philharmonic.

As of 2021, Young currently serves the Fort Wayne Philharmonic as the Guest Conductor for Engagement, while living in Europe.

During his career, he has participated as a conductor at the Columbus Symphony Orchestra, Cabrillo Festival of Contemporary Music, Detroit Symphony Orchestra, Minnesota Orchestra, Oregon Symphony, Russian National Orchestra, Salzburg Festival, and Toledo Symphony Orchestra.

Awards and recognition
 The Great Eight of 2018
 Mayor's Arts Award
 The Ansbacher Fellowship

References

Living people
American conductors (music)
People from Asheville, North Carolina
Year of birth missing (living people)
Jacobs School of Music alumni